Arnaz Jerome Battle (born February 22, 1980) is a former American football wide receiver. He was drafted by the San Francisco 49ers in the sixth round of the 2003 NFL Draft. He played college football at Notre Dame. Battle also played for the Pittsburgh Steelers. He is the son of former NFL tight end Ron Battle.

Early years
When Arnaz was nine years old, Brandon, his younger brother died in a tragic drowning accident. On his upper left arm appears a tattoo of his late brother's face. He prepped at C. E. Byrd High School, where he finished with 5,137 total yards and rushed for 49 career touchdowns while throwing for 28 more and scored one touchdown on a kickoff return. He was a Parade All-America selection and was rated 39th-best player nationally by The Sporting News and 52nd-best player by Chicago Sun-Times. A USA Today honorable mention All-America and third-team All-South quarterback by Fox Sports South.

College career
Battle played quarterback for the University of Notre Dame in his first two seasons, and was named the starting quarterback in 2000. However, against #1 Nebraska in the second game of the year, Battle suffered a broken wrist on the first play from scrimmage and was forced to sit out the remainder of the season. The following year, he was converted to wide receiver, because of his great speed and running ability. He tallied 53 receptions for 742 yards (14.0 avg.) and five touchdowns, adding 314 yards and one touchdown on 62 carries in career. He was an All-America honorable mention and All-Independent first-team selection by The NFL Draft Report, following his senior season at the University of Notre Dame. He saw time at quarterback and completed 30-of-69 passes for 438 yards and two touchdowns. He added academic honors, while maintaining a 3.2 grade point average and majored in sociology and computer applications.

Professional career

San Francisco 49ers
In 2003, he saw action in eight games and recorded two carries for 14 yards to go along with eight tackles and two fumble recoveries on special teams before finishing season on injured reserve with left toe injury.

In 2004, he saw action in 14 games and registered career-highs in punt returns (31), punt return yards (266), kickoff returns (13), kickoff return yards (257) and special teams tackles (16). He was Inactive for the final two contests of the season with a thigh injury. He returned a career-long 71-yard punt return for a touchdown vs. the Arizona Cardinals.

In 2005, he played in 10 games with eight starts and tallied 32 receptions for 363 yards with three touchdowns. He was  inactive for six contests due to a knee injury. He led the team in receiving with five receptions for 59 yards and recorded his first career touchdown on a six-yard pass from QB Tim Rattay vs. the St. Louis Rams. He also completed his first career pass on a 24-yard connection to WR Brandon Lloyd followed by his second career completion later in quarter with a three-yard shovel pass to RB Frank Gore.

In 2006, he played in 16 games with 15 starts and ranked second on the team with career-highs of 59 receptions and 686 receiving yards. He was the only receiver in the NFL with 40 or more catches and no dropped passes. He caught four passes for 37 yards and two tough, short-yardage touchdowns vs. the Oakland Raiders, marking his first career multi-touchdown receiving game. He also hauled in five receptions for 97 yards against the Seattle Seahawks, and added one carry for a career-long 18 yards.

In 2007, he played in 16 games with 15 starts, posting 50 catches for a team-high 600 yards while setting career-highs in touchdown receptions (five) and total touchdowns (six). He was also named as the captain of all of the wide receivers. In the season opener on Monday Night Football against Arizona, he caught a team-high five receptions for 60 yards, while also scoring the go-ahead score on his first career rushing touchdown, a one-yard end around with 22 seconds remaining to give the 49ers a 20-17 victory. He caught a 57-yard touchdown at Arizona, the 49ers’ longest play from scrimmage in 2007. It marked the second longest reception of his career behind a 65-yarder he had from Tim Rattay vs. the Dallas Cowboys. He played, but did not start due to an ankle injury suffered against the Minnesota Vikings and caught two passes for 13 yards with one touchdown. His touchdown catch came in the third quarter on QB Shaun Hill's first career touchdown pass.

Battle logged his first 100-yard game with a 120-yard performance during Week 4 of the 2008 season. He was placed on season-ending injured reserve with a foot injury on December 13, 2008. He finished the 2008 season with 24 catches for 318 yards.

In 2009 finished with 5 catches for 40 yards and help in Special Teams.

Pittsburgh Steelers
On March 8, 2010, Battle signed a three-year contract with the Pittsburgh Steelers worth $3.975 million with $975,000 to sign; He did not have a reception during his first season, but was a standout on special teams. The next year, he was named team captain for special teams. The Steelers released Battle on February 8, 2012.

Personal
His father, Ron Battle, played football at North Texas and then as a tight end for two seasons with the Los Angeles Rams. He is married to Billye Battle and has four kids

References

External links
Arnaz Battle's official website
San Francisco 49ers biography

1980 births
Living people
American football quarterbacks
American football wide receivers
C. E. Byrd High School alumni
Notre Dame Fighting Irish football players
Pittsburgh Steelers players
Players of American football from Dallas
San Francisco 49ers players
African-American players of American football
21st-century African-American sportspeople
20th-century African-American people